Funisia is a genus of animal containing the single species F. dorothea. It is an extinct animal from the Ediacaran biota, discovered in South Australia in 2008 by Mary L. Droser and James G. Gehling.

Description
Because individuals grew in dense collections of animals the same age, it is believed to have reproduced sexually, as well as reproduced by budding like modern sponges and corals. Although the evolution of sex took place before the origin of animals, and evidence of sexual reproduction is observed in red algae , Funisia is one of the oldest known animals for which there is evidence of sexual reproduction.

Its relationship to other animals is unknown, but it may belong within the Porifera (sponges), Cnidaria, or it may have been a basal metazoan similarly to sponges.

The genus and species were described in a 2008 paper.

Etymology
The generic name Funisia is after the Latin "rope", and is pronounced to rhyme with Tunisia.
The name dorothea is in honour of Dorothy Droser, the mother of Mary L. Droser, one of the scientists who studied the organism.

See also
List of Ediacaran genera

References 

Ediacaran life
Enigmatic prehistoric animal genera
Prehistoric invertebrates of Australia